Concepción is a district of the La Unión canton, in the Cartago province of Costa Rica.

Geography 
Concepción has an area of  km² and an elevation of  metres.

Demographics 

For the 2011 census, Concepción had a population of  inhabitants.

Transportation

Road transportation 
The district is covered by the following road routes:
 National Route 202
 National Route 221

References 

Districts of Cartago Province
Populated places in Cartago Province